The 2011 AFC Futsal Club Championship is the 2nd AFC Futsal Club Championship. It was held in Doha, Qatar between June 26 and July 1, 2011.

Qualified teams

Venues

Play-off

Group stage

Group A

Group B

Knockout stage

Semi-finals

Third-place play-off

Final

Awards 

 Most Valuable Player
 Mohammad Keshavarz
 Top Scorer
 Ali Asghar Hassanzadeh (10 goals)
 Fair-Play Award
 Al-Rayyan

Final standing

Top scorers

References
General
 AFC Futsal Club Championship Qatar 2011 – Technical Report & Statistics

External links 
 Official site
 Futsal Planet

AFC Futsal Club Championship seasons
Futsal
International futsal competitions hosted by Qatar
Futsal